The Wellington Central by-election of 1918 was a by-election held in the  electorate during the 19th New Zealand Parliament, on 3 October 1918. It was caused by the death of incumbent MP Robert Fletcher of the Liberal Party and was won by Peter Fraser with a majority of 1,624.

Candidates

Coalition government
The Wartime Coalition government between the Reform Party and Liberal Party sought to retain the seat, though were anxious of their chances of retaining an urban electorate following their narrow win in the Wellington North by-election several months earlier. Under the terms of the coalition agreement between Reform and the Liberal's a condition was made not to oppose each other in by-elections for deceased or retiring MP's from their own parties. Several candidates were approached for the Liberal nomination and eventually William Hildreth, a Wellington City Councillor was selected and endorsed by acting-Prime Minister James Allen.

Labour Party
The Labour Party had supported Robert Fletcher (a left winger amongst the Liberals) in the 1911 and 1914 elections, but decided to contest the election for his vacated seat themselves. Labour were confident following a near victory in the Wellington North by-election earlier in the year. There were three contestants for the Labour Party nomination Peter Fraser, John Read and Michael Reardon. Fraser was selected as the official Labour candidate and had a large local following. Fraser had gained much notability after spending one year in jail for sedition after speaking out against the war and conscription. Even on his release he was still a prominent critic of the government.

Others
Joe Mack stood as an independent Labour candidate. He was a moderate amongst the union movement and unlike most others he supported both the war effort and conscription. To many observers, Mack represented "sane Labour" due to his distance from the radical views held by many socialists at the time. His candidature was put forward by the Protestant Political Association of New Zealand  claiming him to be a patriotic individual and not a "Bolshevik" like many of his union colleagues.

Previous election

|}

Results
The following table gives the election results:

Notes

References

Wellington Central
1918 elections in New Zealand
1910s in Wellington
Events in Wellington
October 1918 events
Politics of the Wellington Region